The Ted Petty Invitational tournament (the TPI) is an independent wrestling tournament in North America, run and promoted by Independent Wrestling Association Mid-South. Created as the Sweet Science Sixteen in 2000 by Ian Rotten, the tournament was originally supposed to showcase the top technical independent wrestlers.  After the death of Ted Petty in September 2002, Rotten changed the name to honor his friend.  The tournament was expanded to 24 participants, with a three-way final, in 2003.  Over the years, the tournament has attracted numerous famous independent wrestlers from Ken Anderson, A.J. Styles to James Gibson.

The Tournament Setup
In the first three years of the Sweet Science Sixteen/TPI, there were only sixteen participants.  With eight opening round matches, four quarterfinal matches, two semifinal matches, and a final, the tournament shows were reasonable in length.  The expansion to twenty-four in 2003 caused the addition of another eight person bracket.  It also created three semifinals matches and a three way final.  The final is now an elimination match.

Tournament winners
2000: Chris Hero
2001: Ace Steel
2002: B. J. Whitmer
2003: Danny Daniels
2004: A.J. Styles
2005: Matt Sydal
2006: Low Ki
2007: Mike Quackenbush
2008: Drake Younger
2015: Kongo Kong
2016: Chris Hero
2017: Aaron Williams
2018: Aaron Williams
2019: Larry D
2020: Tyler Matrix

Results

2000 Sweet Science Sixteen
The first annual Sweet Science Sixteen was held on September 8 and 9, 2000 outside the House of Hardcore in Charlestown, Indiana.

2001 Sweet Science Sixteen
The second annual Sweet Science Sixteen was held on September 7 and 8, 2001 at the House of Hardcore in Charlestown, Indiana.

2002 Ted Petty Invitational
The first-annual Ted Petty Invitational took place on November 1 and 2, 2002 at the IWA Arena in Clarksville, Indiana.

* Whitmer won the IWA Mid-South Heavyweight Championship by defeating Punk in the finals.

Non-tournament matches:

Night One
Necro Butcher defeated Corporal Robinson in a Fans Bring the Weapons Drunken Deathmatch

Night Two
A.J. Styles defeated MDogg20, Matt Stryker and Super Dragon in a Four Corners match
Hailey Hatred defeated Lacey and Rain in a three-way match
Ian Rotten defeated Josh Prohibition
Bull Pain defeated  Necro Butcher, Corporal Robinson, Rollin' Hard, 2 Tuff Tony and Nate Webb in a Gauntlet match

2003 Ted Petty Invitational
The 2003 tournament was the first to expand to twenty-four participants.  Since it was no longer known as the Sweet Science Sixteen, Rotten didn't limit the number to just sixteen wrestlers.  The weekend is still regarded as the hook for drawing in new fans for IWA-MS.

The 2003 Ted Petty Invitational tournament was held on November 7–8, 2003 from the Salem High School in Salem, Indiana.  Among the participants were Styles, former ECW World Champion Jerry Lynn, Michael Shane, the cousin of Shawn Michaels, and future WWE Smackdown star Ken Anderson.  Among the highlights are: Ian Rotten's Cinderella run to the semifinals; Alex Shelley's breakthrough in IWA-MS; and Danny Daniels trying to save his IWA-MS World title throughout the entire tournament.

Finals: Danny Daniels defeated Chris Hero and Alex Shelley to retain the IWA-MS World title and win the 2003 TPI.

Non Tournament Matches:
Night Two:
Mickie Knuckles defeated Rain
Brad Bradley & Ryan Boz defeated J.C. Bailey & Nate Webb
Colt Cabana defeated Arik Cannon, Ken Anderson, M-Dogg 20, Chris Sabin and Michael Shane in an elimination match

2004 Ted Petty Invitational
The 2004 Ted Petty Invitational tournament was held on September 17–18, 2004 from the Lincoln Center in Highland, Indiana.  Among the participants were Styles, Bryan Danielson, Samoa Joe, Chris Hero, Mike Quackenbush, CM Punk, Claudio Castagnoli, A J Styles, Nigel McGuiness and Matt Sydal.  On Night One, Danielson beat Alex Shelley in a technical classic; Joe survived a stiff match with Roderick Strong.  Hero's losing streak in Highland continued with a loss to Quackenbush.  Sydal managed to beat Sal Rinauro.  In a tournament match that was also for the company's heavyweight championship, Petey Williams beat 2002 T.P.I. winner B. J. Whitmer to retain the belt.

Finals: A.J. Styles d. Samoa Joe and Bryan Danielson to win the 2004 TPI

Non Tournament Matches:
Night One:
Mercedes Martinez defeated Lacey to win the IWA-MS/NWA Midwest Women's title
Jimmy Jacobs defeated Delirious in a Ladder Match to win the IWA Mid-South Light Heavyweight title

Night Two
C. J. McManus defeated Billy McNeil and Thunderbolt
Jimmy Jacobs defeated Sal Rinauro to retain the IWA Mid-South Light Heavyweight Title
Ian Rotten and Steve Stone wrestled to a no contest
Larry Sweeney, Hallowicked & Jigsaw defeated Gran Akuma, Icarus & Trik Davis
MsChif defeated Rain, Mickie Knuckles, Daizee Haze, Lacey and Mercedes Martinez in a Non-Title 6-Woman Elimination Match
The Wild Cards (Eddie Kingston & Blackjack Marciano) defeated Iceberg & Tank and Brad Bradley & Ryan Boz to win the IWA-MS Tag Team titles
B. J. Whitmer defeated Chris Sabin, Jimmy Rave, Austin Aries, Alex Shelley, Todd Sexton and Claudio Castagnoli in an elimination match

2005 Ted Petty Invitational
The 2005 Ted Petty Invitational took place on September 23–24, 2005 at the National Guard Armory in Hammond, Indiana.  Although the tournament suffered through numerous drop outs and injuries, it is still highly regarded by independent wrestling fans.  Among the drop outs included: defending champion Styles (due to strep throat) and Homicide (alleged legal issues).

A year after losing in the quarterfinals, Sydal came through with the biggest break of his career.  He beat El Generico in the first round in a crowd-pleasing match.  He also eliminated Tyler Black (quarterfinals), Chris Sabin (semifinals), before overcoming the odds and beating Kevin Steen and Cannon to win the tournament.

Other great matches from that weekend include a title match between Jacobs and Knuckles that saw everyone from Ian Rotten to The Iron Saints get involved.  Shelley and Quackenbush put on a technical classic.  And American Dragon's match with Claudio Castagnoli headlined the first night.

Finals: Matt Sydal defeated Arik Cannon and Kevin Steen to win the 2005 TPI

Non Tournament Matches:

Night One
Jimmy Jacobs defeated Colt Cabana to retain the IWA-MS World title

Night Two
Marek Brave defeated Trik Davis
Jimmy Jacobs defeated Mickie Knuckles to retain the IWA-MS World title
The Iron Saints (Sal & Vito Thomaselli) defeated Rainman & Tank to retain the IWA-MS Tag Team titles
Super Dragon, Alex Shelley, Joey Ryan & Claudio Castagnoli defeated El Generico, Puma, Brandon Thomaselli & Nate Webb in an elimination match

2006 Ted Petty Invitational

The 2006 TPI was held on September 29 & 30, 2006 in Midlothian, IL.  It was another well loved tournament featuring great matches and performances from the likes of Low Ki, Strong, Quackenbush, and many more.  In addition, it saw the shocking returns of Jimmy Jacobs and Necro Butcher to IWA-MS after a lengthy leave of absence as well as Chuck Taylor winning the IWA-MS World title from Toby Klein.

The 2006 TPI saw the return of M-Dogg 20, a former IWA-MS World Champion, to the company and he managed to get to round 2.  Pro Wrestling Guerrilla was represented by six regulars (Chris Bosh, Scott Lost, Scorpio Sky, Kevin Steen, El Generico and Davey Richards) but finished the tournament with a combined 3–6 record.

Finals: Low-Ki defeated Arik Cannon and Roderick Strong to win the 2006 TPI

Non Tournament Matches:

Night Two
The Iron Saints (Sal & Vito Thomaselli) and American Kickboxer & Tarek the Great wrestled to a no contest
BLK OUT (Eddie Kingston & Joker) & Ricochet defeated The Iron Saints (Sal, Vito & Brandon Thomaselli)
The North Star Express (Darin Corbin & Ryan Cruz) won a 6 team Battle Royal, last eliminating B-Boy & Ricky Reyes
Josh Abercrombie defeated Tyler Black in a Loser Leaves Town Match to retain the IWA-MS Light-Heavyweight title
Chuck Taylor defeated Toby Klein to win the IWA-MS World title

2007 Ted Petty Invitational
The 2007 TPI took place on September 28 and 29 in Midlothian. Samoa Joe, Alex Shelley, Low-Ki, Matt Sydal, El Generico, B-Boy, and Tony Kozina were previously scheduled but were later removed from the tournament. Matt Sydal reported to OVW and was not be able to participate, El Generico was out due to hamstring injury, B-Boy was planning on retiring and wanted to heal up before his retirement tour, Jimmy Rave signed with TNA and Tony Kozina removed himself.

Finals: Mike Quackenbush defeated Claudio Castagnoli and Chuck Taylor to win the 2007 TPI, retain the IWA Mid-South Light Heavyweight Championship and win the IWA Mid-South Heavyweight Championship.

Non Tournament Matches:

Night Two -
Eddie Kingston defeated Chris Hero in a Last Man Standing match
The Irons Saints defeated Nigel McGuinness and B. J. Whitmer via DQ to retain the IWA-MS Tag Team Titles

2008 Ted Petty Invitational
The 2008 TPI took place on September 26 and 27 at the Hartman Recreation Center in Joliet, Illinois. Non-tournament matches included a Steel Cage I Quit Match for the Light Heavyweight Championship between Jayson Quick and Jason Hades, a Falls Count Anywhere match between Chris Hero and Trik Davis, and a Loser Leaves IWA Mid-South for a Year Match between Dingo def. Jayson Strife.

The 2008 poster was designed by Mark Young of Wardust Design.

Roster changes
On July 15, 2008, IWA Mid South announced that previously announced entrant Delirious had been taken out of the tournament to work in England along with Roderick Strong. Later, El Generico was also announced to be working the show in England.
On August 8, Arik Cannon was announced as being unavailable to compete in both nights, and was therefore replaced by AAA wrestler Cassandro.
On August 12, it was announced that B. J. Whitmer was undergoing surgery on his hand, and would be replaced by Ares.
At the We Are Family 2 show on August 17, it was announced that Jayson Quick and Jason Hades were both pulled from the TPI and will instead meet in a Steel Cage I Quit Match for the IWA Mid-South Light Heavyweight Championship, with the added stipulation that the loser must drop Ja(y)son from their name.
Before Night One started, it was announced that defending champion Mike Quackenbush would not be taking part in the tournament due to a family emergency.
During the introductions on Night One, Dingo was attacked by Jayson Strife, later demanding he was removed from the tournament.  As such, a Match was booked between Dingo and Strife for the IWA-MS Heavyweight Championship later that night, with the added stipulation that the loser must leave IWA Mid-South for a year
Quackenbush and Dingo were replaced by Necro Butcher and Eddie Kingston

Finals: Drake Younger defeated Claudio Castagnoli and Sami Callihan to win the 2008 TPI.

Non Tournament Matches:

Night 1 - Loser Leaves IWA Mid-South for a Year Match: IWA-MS Heavyweight Championship: Dingo defeated Jayson Strife

Night 2
Tag Team Challenge Match: The Age of the Fall (Jimmy Jacobs & Tyler Black) defeated Da Soul Touchaz (Acid Jazz & Marshee Rockett)
"I Quit" Steel Cage Match for the IWA-MS Light Heavyweight Championship AND rights to the name Ja(y)son: Jason Hades defeated Jayson Quick
Six Man Tag Match: Dingo, Ricochet, and Bobby Fish defeated Prince Mustafa Ali, 2 Tuff Tony, and Ares
Falls Count Anywhere Match: Trik Davis defeated Chris Hero

2015 Ted Petty Invitational
After shows were announced and cancelled in 2009, 2010, 2013 and 2014, the Ted Petty Invitational returned on December 11, 2015, at the Colgate Gymnasium in Clarksville, Indiana. The tournament was won by Kongo Kong, who also won the IWA Mid-South Heavyweight Championship in his semifinal match against former champion Reed Bentley, who had earlier defended his title against Russ Jones.

Non-tournament match: Joseph Schwartz & The Zodiak defeated The Hooligans (Devin Cutter & Mason Cutter) in a Falls Count Anywhere Tag Match.

Finals: Kongo Kong defeated Shane Mercer and Chris Hero to win the 2015 Ted Petty Invitational and retain the IWA Mid-South Heavyweight Championship.

2016 Ted Petty Invitational
The 2016 Ted Petty Invitational was held on November 5 at The Arena in Jeffersonville, Indiana. It featured 16 wrestlers, with eight one on one matches in the first round, two four-way elimination matches in the second round and a one on one final. 

2nd Round:
John Wayne Murdoch def Cole Radrick, Jake Crist and Shane Mercer

Chris Hero def Trik Davis, Rickey Shane Page and Corey Storm

Finals:
Chris Hero def John Wayne Murdoch to win the 2016 Ted Petty Invitational.

2017 Ted Petty Invitational
The 2017 Ted Petty Invitation was held on September 14-15 2017 at the IWA Arena in Memphis, Indiana.

ROUND 1
Zodiak defeated Calvin Tankman
Su Yung defeated Ludark Shaitan
Shane Strickland defeated Ace Perry
Mance Warner defeated Space Monkey
Larry D defeated Kongo Kong
Jonathan Gresham defeated Anthony Henry
Jake Crist defeated Dave Crist
Homicide defeated Gary Jay
Eddie Kingston defeated Nate Webb
Devon Moore defeated Johnathan Wolf
David Starr defeated Shane Mercer
Aaron Williams defeated Arik Cannon(IWA Mid-South Heavyweight Title Match)

QUARTER-FINAL
Su Yung defeated Homicide
Larry D defeated Mance Warner
Jonathan Gresham defeated Devon Moore
Jake Crist defeated Shane Strickland
Eddie Kingston defeated Zodiak
Aaron Williams defeated David Starr (IWA Mid-South Heavyweight Title Match)

SEMI-FINAL
Jonathan Gresham defeated Larry D
Jake Crist defeated Su Yung
Aaron Williams defeated Eddie Kingston (IWA Mid-South Heavyweight Title Match)

Non Tournament Matches: Night 2: Nate Webb defeated Space Monkey; Gary Jay & Ludark Shaitan defeated Anthony Henry & Shane Sabre; Eight Man Tag Team Match: Ace Perry, Cole Radrick, Dave Crist & Kongo Kong defeated Arik Cannon, Calvin Tankman, Johnathan Wolf & Shane Mercer (w/Jason Saint); IWA Mid-South Heavyweight Title Match: Aaron Williams (c) defeated Devon Moore (after the Final)

FINALS
Aaron Williams defeated Jonathan Gresham and Jake Crist (IWA Mid-South Heavyweight Title Match)

2017 Ted Petty Invitational Winner "The Baddest Man Alive" Aaron Williams

2018 Ted Petty Invitational
The 2018 Ted Petty Invitation was held on September 21-22 2018 at the German Park Turner Building in Indianapolis, Indiana.
ROUND 1
Tyler Bateman defeated Tripp Cassidy
Kongo Kong defeated Calvin Tankman
Eddie Kingston defeated Anthony Henry
IWA Mid-South Jr. Heavyweight Title: Pat Monix defeated Logan James(c)
Aaron Williams defeated Jake Crist
Larry D defeated Jake Lander
Devon Moore defeated Myron Reed
Jonathan Wolf defeated Joe Alonzo
Mance Warner defeated Gary Jay
Shane Strickland defeated Jimmy Jacobs
Chase Owens defeated Jake Omen
IWA Mid-South Heavyweight Title: Michael Elgin(c) defeated Shane Mercer

QUARTER-FINAL
IWA Mid-South Jr. Heavyweight Title: Pat Monix(c) defeated Devon Moore
Larry D defeated Kongo Kong
Aaron Williams defeated Tyler Bateman
Mance Warner defeated Jonathan Wolf
Shane Strickland defeated Eddie Kingston
IWA Mid-South Heavyweight Title: Michael Elgin(c) defeated Chase Owens

SEMI-FINAL
Larry D defeated Pat Monix
Aaron Williams defeated Mance Warner
IWA Mid-South Heavyweight Title: Michael Elgin(c) defeated Shane Strickland

Non Tournament Matches; Night 2:IWA Mid-South Tag Team Title Four Way Match: The Top Guys (Adam Slade & Kevin Giza) (w/Billy The P & Lukas Jacobs) defeated The Gym Nasty Boyz (Timmy Lou Retton & White Mike) (c) and Jimmy Jacobs & Joe Alonzo and Logan James & Myron Reed; Eight Man Tag Team Match: Calvin Tankman, Jake Lander, Jake Omen & Matt Kenway defeated Gary Jay, Joey Owens, Shane Mercer & Tripp Cassidy

FINALS
Aaron Williams defeated Michael Elgin & Larry D(IWA Mid-South Heavyweight Title Match)

2018 Ted Petty Invitational Winner "The Baddest Man Alive" Aaron Williams

2019 Ted Petty Invitational
The 2019 Ted Petty Invitation was held on September 12-13 2019 at the Arena in Jeffersonville, Indiana.

2020 Ted Petty Invitational
The 2020 Ted Petty Invitation was rescheduled from last year at The ArenA in Jeffersonville, Indiana and took place between April 23 and April 24, 2021.

Notes

References

Professional wrestling tournaments
Professional wrestling memorial shows
IWA Mid-South
2000 in professional wrestling
2001 in professional wrestling
2002 in professional wrestling
2003 in professional wrestling
2004 in professional wrestling
2005 in professional wrestling
2006 in professional wrestling
2007 in professional wrestling
2008 in professional wrestling
2015 in professional wrestling